Golden State of Mind is the fourth album by California band OPM, released on September 2, 2008.

Track listing
 "Feel the Vibration" (featuring Jim Perkins) - 3:13
 "Family and Friends" (featuring Big B) - 3:54
 "Runaway" - 3:42
 "Tell Me What You Want" (featuring Big B)  - 3:33
 "Dirty White" (featuring Big B) - 3:10
 "Honey" (featuring Big B) - 3:51
 "Square Peg" (featuring Pato Banton) - 4:03
 "Set It on Fire" (featuring Jamie Allensworth) - 3:35
 "Dub Op" (featuring Johnny Richter) - 3:51
 "Every Minute" - 2:55
 "Shoot Em Up" (featuring Sen Dog & Big B) - 3:50
 "Like That" (featuring The Dirtball & Big B) - 3:44
 "Addicted" - 3:40
 "Family and Friends [Saber Mix]" - 4:04

Japanese Bonus Track
15. "Nowhere Fast" - 2:56

Band Line-up
John E. Necro - Lead vocals
Geoff Turney - Guitar
Jonathan Williams - Keyboards
Matt Rowe - Bass
Carlos Perez - Drums

OPM (band) albums
2008 albums
Suburban Noize Records albums